Dalny (lit. remote or far) is an urban locality (a work settlement) in Bilibinsky District of Chukotka Autonomous Okrug, Russia, located west of Bilibino.

History
The settlement was abandoned as a result of the extraction of gold no longer being economically viable. The mines were declared unprofitable and that there was no possibility of developing any other form of economy in 1999 and the settlement was closed along with a number of others in Chukotka. The Russian government guaranteed funds to transport non-working pensioners and the unemployed in liquidated settlements including Dalny from Chukotka to other parts of Russia. The Ministry of railways was obliged to lease containers for the transportation of the migrants' goods to the Chukotkan administration and ensure that they were delivered to the various settlements. Despite the mines closing, the Kupol Gold Project environmental impact assessment, still recorded three people remaining in the settlement as of 2005. However, as of 2008 is in the process of being officially liquidated, and a report on the Klen gold deposit for Highland Gold Mining Ltd reported the settlement as being deserted.

In 1981, one of the world's largest iron meteorites, named "Bilibino", was discovered near the settlement.

Transport
Dalny is not connected to any other inhabited location by permanent road except the now abandoned settlement of Devichiy. However, there is a small network of roads within the settlement including:

 Улица Горняков (Ulitsa Gornyakov, lit. Miners' Street)
 Улица Зеленая (Ulitsa Zelenaya, lit. Green Street)
 Улица Набережная (Ulitsa Naberezhnaya, lit. Quay Street)
 Улица Речной (Ulitsa Rechnoi, lit. River Street)
 Улица Тополевая (Ulitsa Topolevaya, lit. Emperor Street)
 Улица Транспортная (Ulitsa Transportnaya, lit. Transport Street)
 Улица Центральная (Ulitsa Tsentralnaya, lit. Central Street)

Climate
Dalny has a Continental Subarctic or Boreal (taiga) climate (Dfc).

See also
List of inhabited localities in Bilibinsky District

References

Notes

Sources
Bema Gold Corporation, Environmental Impact Assessment, Kupol Gold Project, Far East Russia June 2005.
 

Anonymous, Excerpt from report Audit review of the Klen Gold Deposit, Chukotka Autonomous Region, Russia. (2012), Micon International Co. Ltd.

External links
Photo gallery of Dalny
Short film of Dalny from the air
Short film about the school in Dalny
Short film of mining activities in Dalny

Urban-type settlements in Chukotka Autonomous Okrug